Franklin Andrés Nazareno Macías (born 24 April 1987) is an Ecuadorian sprinter who specializes in the 200 metres. He was born in Portoviejo, Manabí. His personal best time is 20.47 seconds, achieved in June 2007 in Cochabamba. In the 100 metres he has 10.22 seconds, achieved in March 2007 in Cuenca and repeated this same brand in other different cities (La Paz) in the 2008 for becoming the best sprinter in the history of Ecuador and the athlete more often repeated the brand to enter the Beijing 2008 Olympic Games.

He finished sixth at the 2006 World Junior Championships. He also competed at the 2007 World Championships and the 2008 Olympic Games without reaching the final. In Beijing he placed 5th in his 100 metres heat in a time of 10.60 seconds, while he placed 8th in his 200 metres heat, running the distance in 21.26 seconds.

Personal bests
100 m: 10.22 s A (wind: +1.1 m/s) –  Cuenca, 10 March 2007
200 m: 20.47 s A (wind: +0.0 m/s) –  Cochabamba, 3 June 2007
400 m: 47.52 s A –  Quito, 7 September 2006

Competition record

References

External links

1987 births
Living people
Ecuadorian male sprinters
Athletes (track and field) at the 2008 Summer Olympics
Athletes (track and field) at the 2011 Pan American Games
Olympic athletes of Ecuador
People from Portoviejo
Athletes (track and field) at the 2007 Pan American Games
Pan American Games competitors for Ecuador
World Athletics Championships athletes for Ecuador
South American Games gold medalists for Ecuador
South American Games silver medalists for Ecuador
South American Games medalists in athletics
Competitors at the 2006 South American Games
Competitors at the 2014 South American Games
Competitors at the 2007 Summer Universiade
Competitors at the 2009 Summer Universiade
Competitors at the 2011 Summer Universiade
21st-century Ecuadorian people